Conophis vittatus, the  striped road guarder, is a species of snake in the family Colubridae. The species is native to Mexico and Guatemala.

References

Conophis
Snakes of North America
Reptiles described in 1860
Reptiles of Guatemala
Reptiles of Mexico
Taxa named by Wilhelm Peters